This partial list of city nicknames in New York compiles the aliases, sobriquets, and slogans that cities in the U.S. state of New York are known by (or have been known by historically), officially and unofficially, to municipal governments, local people, outsiders, or the cities' tourism boards or chambers of commerce. City nicknames can help in establishing a civic identity, helping outsiders recognize a community or attracting people to a community because of its nickname; promote civic pride; and build community unity. Nicknames and slogans that successfully create a new community "ideology or myth" are also believed to have economic value. Their economic value is difficult to measure, but there are anecdotal reports of cities that have achieved substantial economic benefits by "branding" themselves by adopting new slogans.

Some unofficial nicknames are positive, while others are derisive. The unofficial nicknames listed here have been in use for a long time or have gained wide currency.

Nicknames by city

A
Albany
Cradle of the Union
Nippertown 
Smallbany (somewhat derisive)
Amsterdam – The Carpet City
Auburn
History's Hometown
The Prison City (for Auburn Correctional Facility, formerly Auburn Prison)

B
Binghamton
Parlor City
Carousel Capital of the World
Valley of Opportunity
The Triple Cities (with Johnson City and Endicott)
Hockey Town USA
The Bronx (part of New York City)
Boogie Down
The Birthplace of Hip-Hop
Brooklyn (part of New York City)
The Borough of Homes and Churches (also "Borough of Churches" or "Borough of Homes") 
The Borough of Trees
Buffalo
The City of Good Neighbors
The City of Light (nickname at the time of the 1901 World's Fair)
The City of No IllusionsThe Urban Design Project, The Queen City Hub: A Regional Action Plan for Downtown Buffalo , accessed February 12, 2011
The Nickel City
The Queen City (or The Queen City of the Great Lakes)Barry Popik, Smoky City, barrypopik.com website, March 27, 2005

C
Canandaigua – The Chosen Spot
Chazy – The World Capital of McIntosh Apples
Cooperstown – Birthplace of Baseball
Corinth – Snowshoe Capital of the World
Corning – The Crystal City
Cortland – The Crown City

E
Elba – Onion Capital of the World
Elmira – Soaring Capital of the World
Endicott
The Magic City
The Triple Cities (with Binghamton and Johnson City)

F
Florida – The Onion Capital of the World
Fulton – City with a Future

G
Geneva – Lake Trout Capital of the WorldClaims to Fame - Fish, Epodunk, accessed April 16, 2007.
Granville – Slate Capital of the World

H
Hamburg – The Town That Friendship Built
Hammondsport – Cradle of Aviation
Haverstraw – Bricktown or Brickmaking Capital of the WorldBrownfields Assessment Pilot Fact Sheet: Haverstraw, NY, U.S. Environmental Protection Agency, accessed December 24, 2008
Hornell – The Maple City
Hurley – Sweet Corn Capital of the World

I
Indian Lake-The Whitewater Rafting Capital
Ithaca - City of Gorges, Ten Square Miles Surrounded by Reality

J
Jamestown 
The Furniture Capital of the World (1880s-1940s)
The Pearl City
Johnson City
Home of the Square Deal
The Triple Cities (with Binghamton and Endicott)

K
Kingston – Breadbasket of the RevolutionCity of Kingston 2011 Visitors' Guide, page 26. Accessed December 1, 2011

L
Lockport – Lock City
Long Beach – The City by the Sea

M

Manhattan (borough of New York City) – The City
Mechanicville – The Paper City 
Monsey – Ir Hakodesh ("the holy city" in Hebrew)

 Mount Vernon - “Money Earnin’”

N

New Rochelle
Queen City of the Sound
The City of Huguenots
The City of Parks

New York City 
The Big AppleWhy Is New York City Called "The Big Apple"? , accessed April 16, 2007.
The Capital of the World
The City of Dreams
The City So Nice, They Named It Twice
The City That Never Sleeps
Empire CityArt and the Empire City: New York, 1825–1861, Metropolitan Museum of Art, accessed April 16, 2007.
The Five Boroughs
Fun City
Gotham
Niagara Falls – Cataract City
North Tonawanda – Lumber City

O
Ogdensburg
The Maple City (19th century)
The New York of the North (mid-19th century)

P
Palmyra – Queen of Canal Towns 
Pearl River – The Town of Friendly People
Phelps – Sauerkraut Capital
Pine Island – Onion Capital of the World
Plattsburgh – Ville Sur Le Lac (French) or The Lake City (English)
Poughkeepsie
Queen City of the Hudson

Q
Queens -- The World's Borough

R
Rhinebeck – Anemone Capital of the World
Rochester
The Flour City (historical)FAQs, Visit Rochester website, accessed April 28. 2012
The Flower City (contemporary)
Ra-Cha-Cha
Roc City
Snapshot City
Young Lion of the West
The World's Image Centre (1990's)
Rome – Copper City
Roscoe – Trout Town USA

S

Saratoga Springs
The Racing City
The Spa City
Toga
Schenectady
Electric City
The City That Lights and Hauls the World
Staten Island (borough of New York City)
The Borough of Parks
The Forgotten Borough
Shaolin
Syracuse – Salt City

T
Troy 
The Collar City
The Troylet
Troyalty

U
Utica 
The City That God Forgot
Handshake City
Sin City
Cord Blood City 

W
Watertown – The Garland City
Westfield – Grape Juice Capital of the World

Y
Yonkers
The Lost Borough
City of Seven Hills
City of Gracious Living

See also
List of city nicknames in the United States
List of cities in New York (state)
List of places in New York (state)
List of towns in New York (state)
List of villages in New York (state)

References

External links
a list of American and a few Canadian nicknames
U.S. cities list

New York cities and towns
Populated places in New York (state)
City nicknames